Peter John North (born August 23, 1960) is former politician in Ontario, Canada. He was a New Democratic member of the Legislative Assembly of Ontario from 1990 to 1999 who represented the southwestern Ontario riding of Elgin. He was a cabinet minister in the government of Bob Rae. In 1993 he left the New Democratic Party in an unsuccessful attempt to join the Progressive Conservative Party. For the next seven years he sat as an independent member.

He was the first MPP of First Nations descent ever elected to Ontario's provincial legislature.

Background
North graduated from high school in 1979 and worked as a building contractor.

Politics

New Democrat
He was elected to the legislature in the 1990 Ontario election as the New Democratic Party Member of Provincial Parliament (MPP) for Elgin, defeating incumbent Liberal Marietta Roberts by over 4,000 votes. As one of the few NDP MPPs to represent a rural constituency in southern Ontario, North was appointed to Bob Rae's cabinet as Minister of Tourism and Recreation on October 1, 1990. He resigned as tourism minister in November 1992 after allegations he had offered a government job to a woman with whom he was having an unconsummated affair. An investigation by the Ontario Provincial Police found no evidence of wrongdoing, but North was not returned to cabinet by Rae.

Cabinet positions

Independent
North resigned from the NDP in August 1993 and declared his intention to join the Progressive Conservative Party. He did not discuss this with the party in advance, however, and was told that he would have to get the support of the riding association in Elgin before he would be accepted by the party. North then sat as an independent.

North was re-elected in the 1995 provincial election. Defeating Progressive Conservative candidate Jim Williams by nearly 2,000 votes, he became the first MPP in the province to be elected as an independent candidate since 1934. He had no formal legislative responsibilities from 1995 to 1997 and made only minor contributions to legislative debate.

North did not seek re-election in 1999, clearing the way for PC incumbent Bruce Smith to run (unsuccessfully) in the redistributed riding of Elgin—Middlesex—London. In July 1999, North was appointed co-ordinator of Community Sport and Recreation Development by the government.

Failed Comeback
North resumed his old career as a contractor based in Port Stanley, Ontario with one failed comeback attempt in 2011 as a PC nomination candidate for Elgin—Middlesex—London, but lost to Jeff Yurek who went on to become elected.

References

External links

1960 births
Living people
Independent MPPs in Ontario
Members of the Executive Council of Ontario
Ontario New Democratic Party MPPs
People from St. Thomas, Ontario
First Nations politicians